Stefan Trofan (4 April 1962 – 1 September 2008) was a former British para table tennis player. In his childhood years, he was very interested in football and was a keen footballer, he was paralysed from the waist down aged 17 in a bike accident. He played alongside Neil Robinson and James Rawson in table tennis team events internationally. He coached Great Britain's Paralympic table tennis team for the 2008 Summer Paralympics.

He died of oesophageal cancer on 21 August 2008 in Sheffield surrounded by family, days before the Summer Paralympics in Beijing, China.

References

1962 births
2008 deaths
Paralympic table tennis players of Great Britain
Medalists at the 2000 Summer Paralympics
Table tennis players at the 2000 Summer Paralympics
Table tennis players at the 2004 Summer Paralympics
Sportspeople from Oldham
Medalists at the 2004 Summer Paralympics
Paralympic medalists in table tennis
Paralympic silver medalists for Great Britain